Wyndham Willoughby Lathem (born August 10, 1974) is an American microbiologist and convicted murderer. He is a former associate professor at Feinberg School of Medicine at Northwestern University, a specialist in pathogenic bacteria.

On July 27, 2017, 26-year-old Trenton Cornell-Duranleau, Lathem's boyfriend, was fatally stabbed over 70 times in Lathem's high-rise apartment. Following the stabbing Lathem went on the run but turned himself in to police in Oakland, California on August 4. He was indicted in September 2017 on charges of first-degree murder. Prosecutors say Lathem and Andrew Warren, a former Oxford University employee, conspired to kill the victim as part of a premeditated murder-sex fantasy.

Early life
Wyndham Lathem was born August 10, 1974. He completed his AB in biology at Vassar College (1992–96). He was a research technician at Rockefeller University from 1996 to 1998 in the laboratory of James E. Darnell, Jr., and earned his PhD from the University of Wisconsin–Madison in microbiology (2003) in the laboratory of Rod Welch.

Career
Lathem was a post-doctoral fellow at Washington University School of Medicine in molecular microbiology from 2003 to 2007 in the laboratory of Bill Goldman, now professor and chair of microbiology and immunology at the University of North Carolina in Chapel Hill. Goldman described Lathem as "very competitive in terms of getting NIH [National Institutes of Health] funding for his work ... and is respected for high quality research".

Until his employment was terminated on August 4, 2017, Lathem was associate professor of microbiology-immunology in the Feinberg School of Medicine at Northwestern University. His research relates to how pathogenic bacteria, specifically Yersinia pestis, the Black Death plague, cause disease in human beings and how the bacterium has evolved over time. In 2016 he spoke at the University of North Carolina at Chapel Hill School of Medicine on "Your Own Worst Enemy: How Yersinia pestis Turns the Body Against Itself." In 2017, he presented on "From Mild to Murderous: How Yersinia pestis Evolved to Cause Pneumonic Plague".

Arrest
In early August 2017, he and Andrew Warren were detained in connection with the July 27, 2017 fatal stabbing of Trenton Cornell-Duranleau that occurred at Lathem's apartment in Chicago. On August 4 Lathem turned himself in to police in Oakland, California, and Warren turned himself in to police in San Francisco. He was returned to Chicago on August 18. He remains incarcerated in Chicago's Cook County Jail, where he is awaiting trial. He has entered a plea of "not guilty" to murder charges. During the COVID-19 Pandemic, Lathem's lawyers applied for bail, so he could assist in researching the virus, but his application was denied. Lathem was found guilty on October 7, 2021.

References

External links 

1974 births
Living people
American microbiologists
University of Wisconsin–Madison alumni
Vassar College alumni
Northwestern Medicine faculty
Washington University in St. Louis fellows